Coenzyme Q reductase may refer to:
 NADH dehydrogenase
 NADH:ubiquinone reductase (non-electrogenic)